Hepu is a county in Guangxi, China.
 Hepu Commandery, ancient China

Hepu may also refer to:

 Hepu (vizier), ancient Egyptian vizier
 Hepu District (河浦区), former district of Shantou, Guangdong
 Hepu, Hubei (河铺镇), town in Luotian County
 Hepu, Zhejiang (鹤浦镇), town in Xiangshan County